Elaphidiini is a tribe of beetles in the subfamily Cerambycinae, historically also often spelled "Elaphidionini".

Genera

 Adiposphaerion Martins & Napp, 1992
 Aetheibidion Martins, 1968
 Alicianella Noguera, 2006
 Allotisis Pascoe, 1866
 Allotraeus Bates, 1887
 Ambonus Gistel, 1848
 Amethysphaerion Martins & Monné, 1975
 Amorupi Martins, 2005
 Anama Martins, 2005
 Aneflomorpha Casey, 1912
 Aneflus LeConte, 1873
 Anelaphus Linsley, 1936
 Anopliomorpha Linsley, 1936
 Anoplocurius Fisher, 1920
 Apoclausirion Martins & Napp, 1992
 Aposphaerion Bates, 1870
 Appula Thomson, 1864
 Apyrauna Martins, 2005
 Armylaena Thomson, 1878
 Astromula Chemsak & Linsley, 1965
 Atesta Pascoe, 1866
 Atharsus Bates, 1867
 Atylostagma White, 1853
 Centrocerum Chevrolat, 1861
 Clausirion Martins & Napp, 1984
 Coleocoptus Aurivillius, 1893
 Conosphaeron Linsley, 1935
 Coptocercus Hope, 1840
 Cordylomera Audinet-Serville, 1834
 Cotyperiboeum Glileo & Martins, 2010
 Curtomerus
 Demelius Waterhouse, 1874
 Elaphidion Audinet-Serville, 1834
 Elaphidionopsis Linsley, 1936
 Enaphalodes Haldemann, 1847
 Epithora Pascoe, 1866
 Etymosphaerion Martins & Monné, 1975
 Eurysthea Thomson, 1860
 Eustromula Cockerell, 1906
 Gymnopsyra Linsley, 1937
 Hemilissopsis Lane, 1959
 Heteronyssicus Tavakilian & Dalens, 2014
 Hoplogrammicosum Gounelle, 1913
 Ironeus Bates, 1872
 Iuaca Galileo & Martins, 2000
 Jampruca Napp & Martins, 1982
 Lanephus Martins, 2005
 Linsleyonides Skiles, 1985
 Liogramma Bates, 1874
 Magaliella Galileo & Martins, 2008
 Mallocera Audinet-Serville, 1833
 Meganeflus Linsley, 1961
 Megapsyrassa Linsley, 1961
 Mephritus Pascoe, 1866
 Metironeus Chemsak, 1991
 Micraneflus Linsley, 1957
 Micranoplium Linsley, 1947
 Micropsyrassa Linsley, 1961
 Miltesthus Bates, 1872
 Minipsyrassa Martins, 1974
 Monoplia Newman, 1845
 Morphaneflus Martins & Napp, 1992
 Neaneflus Linsley, 1957
 Neomallocera Martins & Napp, 1992
 Neoperiboeum Linsley, 1961
 Nephalioides Linsley, 1961
 Nephalius Newman, 1841
 Nesanoplium Chemsak, 1966
 Nesiosphaerion Martins & Napp, 1982
 Nesodes Linsley, 1935
 Nyphasia Pascoe, 1867
 Nyssicostylus Melzer, 1923
 Nyssicus Pascoe, 1859
 Orion Guérin-Méneville, 1844
 Orwellion Skiles, 1985
 Pantonyssus Bates, 1870
 Paranyssicus Martins, 2005
 Parapantonyssus Galileo & Martins, 2010
 Paraskeletodes Aurivillius, 1927
 Parasphaerion Martins & Napp, 1992
 Parastizocera Linsley, 1961
 Paratesta Wang, Q., 1993
 Parelaphidion Skiles, 1985
 Periboeum Thomson, 1864
 Phoracantha Newman, 1840
 Phytrocaria Wang, Q., 1996
 Piezophidion Galileo & Martins, 1992
 Pilisphaerion Martins & Napp, 1992
 Poecilomallus Bates, 1892
 Porithodes Aurivillius, 1912
 Protomallocera Martins & Napp, 1992
 Protosphaerion Gounelle, 1909
 Pseudomallocera Zajciw, 1961
 Pseudoperiboeum Linsley, 1935
 Psyrassa Pascoe, 1866
 Psyrassaforma Chemsak, 1991
 Rhomboidederes Zajciw, 1963
 Romulus Knull, 1948
 Semiphoracantha Vives, Sudre, Mille & Cazères, 2011
 Skeletodes Newman, 1850
 Sphaerioeme Martins & Napp, 1992
 Sphaerion Audinet-Serville, 1834
 Sphaerionillum Bates, 1885
 Steata Wang, Q., 1995
 Stenelaphus Linsley, 1936
 Stenosphenus Haldemann, 1847
 Stizocera Audinet-Serville, 1834
 Terpnissa Bates, 1867
 Thoris Pascoe, 1867
 Trichophoroides Linsley, 1935
 Tropimerus Giesbert, 1987
 Urorcites Thomson, 1878
 Yorkeica Blackburn, 1899

References

 
Polyphaga tribes